Raková may refer to places:

Czech Republic
Raková (Rokycany District), a municipality and village
Raková u Konice, a municipality and village
Zádveřice-Raková, a municipality and village

Serbia
Rakova (Čačak), a village
Rakova Bara, a village

Slovakia
Raková, Čadca District, a municipality and village

Slovenia
Rakova Steza, a village